Donatas Tarolis (born March 30, 1994) is a Lithuanian professional basketball player for CSM Oradea of the Romanian  Liga Națională. Tarolis is a native of Gargždai.

Professional career
Tarolis started his career in his hometown club BC Gargždai-Bremena, which played in the Lithuanian second-tier  National Basketball League (NKL). For the 2013–2014 season, he moved to Žalgiris-2 Kaunas, the reserve team of Žalgiris Kaunas. After averaging 16.0 points, 7.0 rebounds and 1.6 blocks per game, Tarolis received the NKL Most Valuable Player award. In the following year, he joined the senior Žalgiris Kaunas squad. In 18 Lithuanian Basketball League games, he averaged 4.2 points and 2.3 rebounds.

On 9 October 2015, Tarolis signed with Traiskirchen Lions of the Austrian Basketball Superliga.

On 8 September 2016, Tarolis signed a three-year contract with Lietkabelis Panevėžys of Lithuanian Basketball League (LKL).

On 9 August 2019, Tarolis signed with U-BT Cluj-Napoca of the Romanian Liga Națională. He averaged 12.4 points per game during the 2019-20 season with Cluj. On July 2, 2020, he re-signed with the team.

On 3 August 2021, Tarolis signed with Afyon Belediye of the Turkish Basketbol Süper Ligi (BSL). Tarolis averaged 10.4 points, 5.0 rebounds, and 1.5 assists per game. 

On 8 December 2021, Tarolis signed with Budućnost VOLI of the Adriatic League and the EuroCup.

On 30 July 2022, Tarolis signed with CSM Oradea of the Liga Națională.

National team career
Tarolis won gold medal with the Lithuanian team during the 2017 Summer Universiade after defeating the United States' team 74–85 in the final.

References

External links
Donatas Tarolis at realgm.com
Donatas Tarolis at lkl.lt

1994 births
Living people
Afyonkarahisar Belediyespor players
BC Lietkabelis players
BC Žalgiris players
BC Žalgiris-2 players
CS Universitatea Cluj-Napoca (men's basketball) players
CSM Oradea (basketball) players
KK Budućnost players
Lithuanian expatriate basketball people in Austria
Lithuanian expatriate basketball people in Romania
Lithuanian expatriate basketball people in Turkey
Lithuanian men's basketball players
Medalists at the 2017 Summer Universiade
Power forwards (basketball)
Traiskirchen Lions players
Universiade gold medalists for Lithuania
Universiade medalists in basketball
People from Gargždai